Mika Kristian Halvari (born February 13, 1970 in Kemi) is a Finnish former shot putter. When competing, he represented Kemin Kunto and Helsingin Kisa-Veikot.

Halvari won the 1995 IAAF World Indoor Championships in Barcelona, Spain and came in second in the World Championships in Athletics in Gothenburg, Sweden the same year. In 1998, he won a silver medal at the 1998 European Indoor Athletics Championships held in Valencia, Spain. In addition to his success internationally, Halvari has won 4 gold medals, 3 silver and 1 bronze in the Finnish Championships.

Towards the end of his career, Halvari was injured numerous times; for example, his Achilles tendon snapped twice.

His personal best outdoors is 21.50 metres, which he put on July 9, 1995 in Hämeenkyrö, Finland. Indoors, he still holds the Nordic record for his put of 22.09 m, which he achieved on February 7, 2000 in Tampere, Finland.

Halvari was the 11th shotputter accepted into the 20 meter club.

Major achievements

External links

1970 births
Living people
People from Kemi
Finnish male shot putters
Athletes (track and field) at the 1996 Summer Olympics
Olympic athletes of Finland
World Athletics Championships medalists
World Athletics Indoor Championships winners
Sportspeople from Lapland (Finland)